John Johnson Hossell (25 May 1914 – 8 July 1999) was an English cricketer who played for Warwickshire from 1939 to 1947. He was born in Handsworth, Birmingham and died in Chipping Campden. He appeared in 35 first-class matches as a left-handed batsman who bowled left-arm orthodox spin. He scored 1,217 runs with a highest score of 83 and took seven wickets with a best performance of three for 24.

References

1914 births
1999 deaths
English cricketers
Warwickshire cricketers
Cricketers from Birmingham, West Midlands
English cricketers of 1919 to 1945
English cricketers of 1946 to 1968
Cricketers from Handsworth, West Midlands